was a town located in Yamagata District, Hiroshima Prefecture, Japan. It has abundant forest resources.

As of 2003, the village had an estimated population of 1,193 and a density of 22.06 persons per km². The total area was 54.07 km².

History 
 1 April 1889 (Meiji 22) - Upon the enforcement of the municipal system, the Uezunuga village merged with Nakagonuga village, and Tsutsuga was established.
 On 1 October 2004, Tsutsuga, along with the towns of Kake and Togouchi (all from Yamagata District), was merged to create the town of Akiōta.

Geography

Rivers 
 Ōta River
 Tsutsuga River - tributary of Ōta River

References

External links
 Official website of Akiōta 

Dissolved municipalities of Hiroshima Prefecture